This is a list of oil-producing countries by oil exports based on The World Factbook and other Sources. Many countries also import oil, and some import more oil than they export.

Countries by rank

Oil export revenues 
Academic contributions have written about differences in petroleum revenue management in various countries. Many scholars see the natural resource wealth in some countries as a natural resource blessing, while in others it has been referred to as a natural resource curse. A vast body of resource curse literature has studied the role of governance regimes, legal frameworks and political risk in building an economy based on natural resource exploitation. However, whether it is seen as a blessing or a curse, the recent political decisions regarding the future of petroleum production in many countries were given an extractivist direction, thus also granting a status quo to the exploitation of natural resources.
The PRIX index forecasts the effect of political developments on exports from major petroleum-producing countries.

See also
List of countries by oil production
List of countries by exports
List of countries by net oil exports
List of countries by proven oil reserves

References

Energy-related lists by country
Exports
Trade by commodity
List of countries by oil exports
Lists of countries
Lists of countries by product exports